Karaops is a genus of Australian wall spiders that was first described by S. C. Crews & Mark Stephen Harvey in 2011.

Species
 it contains fifty-four species, found in New South Wales, South Australia, the Northern Territory, Queensland, and Western Australia:

Karaops alanlongbottomi Crews & Harvey, 2011 – Australia (Western Australia)
Karaops badgeradda Crews & Harvey, 2011 – Australia (Western Australia)
Karaops banyjima Crews, 2013 – Australia (Western Australia)
Karaops burbidgei Crews & Harvey, 2011 – Australia (Western Australia)
Karaops conilurus Crews, 2023 – Australia (Western Australia)
Karaops dalmanyi Crews, 2023 – Australia (Western Australia)
Karaops dawara Crews & Harvey, 2011 – Australia (Northern Territory)
Karaops dejongi Crews, 2023 – Australia (Western Australia)
Karaops deserticola Crews & Harvey, 2011 – Australia (South Australia)
Karaops durrantorum Crews, 2023 – Australia (Western Australia)
Karaops ellenae Crews & Harvey, 2011 (type) – Australia (Western Australia)
Karaops feedtime Crews, 2013 – Australia (Western Australia)
Karaops forteyi Crews, 2013 – Australia (Western Australia)
Karaops francesae Crews & Harvey, 2011 – Australia (Western Australia)
Karaops gangarie Crews & Harvey, 2011 – Australia (Queensland)
Karaops garyodwyeri Crews, 2023 – Australia (Western Australia)
Karaops jaburrara Crews, 2013 – Australia (Western Australia)
Karaops jarrit Crews & Harvey, 2011 – Australia (Western Australia)
Karaops jawayway Crews, 2023 – Australia (Northern Territory)
Karaops jenniferae Crews & Harvey, 2011 – Australia (Western Australia)
Karaops joehaeneri Crews, 2023 – Australia (Western Australia)
Karaops julianneae Crews & Harvey, 2011 – Australia (Western Australia)
Karaops kariyarra Crews, 2013 – Australia (Western Australia)
Karaops karrawarla Crews & Harvey, 2011 – Australia (Western Australia)
Karaops keithlongbottomi Crews & Harvey, 2011 – Australia (Western Australia)
Karaops kennerleyorum Crews, 2023 – Australia (Northern Territory)
Karaops kwartatuma Crews, 2023 – Australia (Northern Territory)
Karaops larapinta Crews, 2023 – Australia (Northern Territory)
Karaops larryoo Crews & Harvey, 2011 – Australia (Western Australia)
Karaops madhawundu Crews, 2023 – Australia (Queensland)
Karaops malumbu Crews, 2023 – Australia (Western Australia)
Karaops manaayn Crews & Harvey, 2011 – Australia (New South Wales)
Karaops mareeba Crews, 2023 – Australia (Queensland)
Karaops markharveyi Crews, 2023 – Australia (Western Australia, Northern Territory)
Karaops marrayagong Crews & Harvey, 2011 – Australia (New South Wales)
Karaops martamarta Crews & Harvey, 2011 – Australia (Western Australia)
Karaops monteithi Crews & Harvey, 2011 – Australia (Queensland)
Karaops morganoconnelli Crews, 2023 – Australia (Western Australia)
Karaops mparntwe Crews, 2023 – Australia (Northern Territory)
Karaops ngarluma Crews, 2013 – Australia (Western Australia)
Karaops ngarutjaranya Crews & Harvey, 2011 – Australia (South Australia)
Karaops nitmiluk Crews, 2023 – Australia (Northern Territory)
Karaops nyamal Crews, 2013 – Australia (Western Australia)
Karaops nyangumarta Crews, 2013 – Australia (Western Australia)
Karaops nyiyaparli Crews, 2013 – Australia (Western Australia)
Karaops pilkingtoni Crews & Harvey, 2011 – Australia (Northern Territory)
Karaops raveni Crews & Harvey, 2011 – Australia (Queensland, New South Wales)
Karaops strayamate Crews, 2023 – Australia (Queensland)
Karaops toolbrunup Crews & Harvey, 2011 – Australia (Western Australia)
Karaops umiida Crews, 2013 – Australia (Western Australia)
Karaops vadlaadambara Crews & Harvey, 2011 – Australia (South Australia)
Karaops yumbu Crews, 2013 – Australia (Western Australia)
Karaops yumbubaarnji Crews, 2023 – Australia (Western Australia)
Karaops yurlburr Crews, 2013 – Australia (Western Australia)

See also
 List of Selenopidae species

References

Araneomorphae genera
Selenopidae
Spiders of Australia